Iain Murray may refer to:

Iain Murray (author) (born 1931), British pastor and author
Iain Murray, 10th Duke of Atholl (1931–1996), Scottish peer and landowner
Iain Murray (sailor) (born 1958), Australian sailor

See also 
Ian Murray (disambiguation)